Alyaksey Suchkow (born 10 June 1981) is a Belarusian retired football midfielder.

In July 2020 Suchkow was found guilty of being involved in a match-fixing schema in Belarusian football. He was sentenced to 1 year of house arrest and banned from Belarusian football for life.

References

External links

1981 births
Living people
Belarusian footballers
Association football midfielders
Belarus international footballers
Belarusian expatriate footballers
Expatriate footballers in Russia
Expatriate footballers in Ukraine
Belarusian expatriate sportspeople in Ukraine
Expatriate footballers in Kazakhstan
Ukrainian Premier League players
Russian Premier League players
FC Neman Grodno players
FC Neman Mosty players
FC Karpaty Lviv players
FC Shinnik Yaroslavl players
FC Kharkiv players
FC Shakhter Karagandy players
FC Shakhtyor Soligorsk players
FC Torpedo-BelAZ Zhodino players
FC Naftan Novopolotsk players
People from Lida
Sportspeople from Grodno Region